Nikolay Gavrilovich Chernyshevsky (Russian: Никола́й Гаври́лович Черныше́вский) 	( – ) was a Russian literary and social critic, journalist, novelist, democrat, and socialist philosopher, often identified as a utopian socialist and leading theoretician of Russian nihilism. He was the dominant intellectual figure of the 1860s revolutionary democratic movement in Russia, despite spending much of his later life in exile to Siberia, and was later highly praised by Karl Marx, Georgi Plekhanov, and Vladimir Lenin.

Biography
The son of a priest, Chernyshevsky was born in Saratov in 1828, and stayed there until 1846. He graduated at the local seminary  where he learned English, French, German, Italian, Latin, Greek and Old Slavonic. It was there he gained a love of literature. At St Petersburg University he often struggled to warm his room. He kept a diary of trivia like the number of tears he shed over a dead friend. It was here that he became an atheist.

He was inspired by the works of Hegel, Ludwig Feuerbach and Charles Fourier and particularly the works of Vissarion Belinsky and Alexander Herzen. By the time he graduated from the Saint Petersburg University in 1850, Chernyshevsky developed revolutionary, democratic, and materialist views. From 1851 to 1853, he taught Russian language and literature at the Saratov Gymnasium. He openly expressed his beliefs to students, some of whom later became revolutionaries. From 1853 to 1862, he lived in Saint Petersburg, and became the chief editor of Sovremennik (“The Contemporary”), in which he published his main literary reviews and his essays on philosophy.

Chernyshevsky was sympathetic to the 1848 revolutions throughout Europe. He followed the events of the time and rejoiced in the gains of the democratic and revolutionary parties.

In 1855, Chernyshevsky defended his master's dissertation, "The Aesthetic Relation of Art to Reality", which contributed for the development of materialist aesthetics in Russia. Chernyshevsky believed that "What is of general interest in life -- that is the content of art" and that art should be a "textbook of life." He wrote, "Science is not ashamed to say that its aim is to understand and explain reality, and then to use its explanation for man's benefit. Let not art be ashamed to admit that its aim is ... to reproduce this precious reality and explain it for the good of mankind."

In 1862, he was arrested and confined in the Fortress of St. Peter and Paul, where he wrote his famous novel What Is to Be Done? The novel was an inspiration to many later Russian revolutionaries, who sought to emulate the novel's hero Rakhmetov, who was wholly dedicated to the revolution, ascetic in his habits and ruthlessly disciplined, to the point of sleeping on a bed of nails and eating only raw steak in order to build strength for the Revolution. Among those who have referenced the novel include Lenin, who wrote a political pamphlet of the same name.

In 1862, Chernyshevsky was sentenced to civil execution (mock execution), followed by penal servitude (1864–1872), and by exile to Vilyuisk, Siberia (1872–1883). He died at the age of 61.

Ideas and influence

Chernyshevsky was a founder of Narodism, Russian populism, and agitated for the revolutionary overthrow of the autocracy and the creation of a socialist society based on the old peasant commune. He exercised the greatest influence upon populist youth of the 1860s and 1870s.

Chernyshevsky believed that American democracy was the best aspect of American life. He welcomed the election of Abraham Lincoln in 1860, which he believed marked a new period for "the great North American people" and that America would progress to heights "not attained since Jefferson's time." He praised these developments: "The good repute of the North American nation is important for all nations with the rapidly growing significance of the North American states in the life of all humanity."

Chernyshevsky's ideas were heavily influenced by Alexander Herzen, Vissarion Belinsky, and Ludwig Andreas Feuerbach. He saw class struggle as the means of society's forward movement and advocated for the interests of the working people. In his view, the masses were the chief maker of history. He is reputed to have used the phrase “the worse the better”, to indicate that the worse the social conditions became for the poor, the more inclined they would be to launch a revolution (though he did not originate the phrase, which predates his birth; for example, in an 1814 letter John Adams used it when discussing the lead-up to the American revolution).

There are those arguing, in the words of Professor Joseph Frank, that “Chernyshevsky’s novel What Is to Be Done?, far more than Marx’s Das Kapital, supplied the emotional dynamic that eventually went to make the Russian Revolution”.

Fyodor Dostoyevsky was enraged by what he saw as the simplicity of the political and psychological ideas expressed in the book, and wrote Notes from Underground largely as a reaction against it.

Russian revolutionary and head of the Soviet government Vladimir Lenin praised Chernyshevsky: "..he approached all the political events of his times in a revolutionary spirit and was able to exercise a revolutionary influence by advocating, in spite of all the barriers and obstacles placed in his way by the censorship, the idea of a peasant revolution, the idea of the struggle of the masses for the overthrow of all the old authorities”

Karl Marx and Friedrich Engels studied Chernyshevsky's works and called him a "great Russian scholar and critic".

A number of scholars have contended that Ayn Rand, who grew up in Russia when Chernyshevsky's novel was still influential and ubiquitous, was influenced by the book.

Works
Aesthetic Relations of Art to Reality  From:Russian Philosophy Volume II: The Nihilists, The Populists, Critics of Religion and Culture, Quadrangle Books 1965
Essays on the Gogol Period in Russian Literature
Critique of Philosophical Prejudices Against Communal Ownership
The Anthropological Principle in Philosophy
What Is to Be Done? (1863), a novel
Prologue: A Novel for the Beginning of the 1860s (1870), a novel
The Nature of Human Knowledge

Notes

References

Further reading
Vladimir Nabokov’s The Gift has the protagonist, Fyodor Godunov-Cherdyntsev, study Chernyshevsky and write the critical biography The Life of Chernychevski which represents Chapter Four of the novel. The publication of this work caused a literary scandal.
Paperno, Irina, Chernyshevsky and the Age of Realism: A Study in the Semiotics of Behavior. Stanford: Stanford University Press, 1988.
Pereira, N.G.O., The Thought and Teachings of N.G. Černyševskij. The Hague: Mouton, 1975.

External links
 
 
 Selected Philosophical Essays in PDF format
 

1828 births
1889 deaths
Writers from Saratov
People from Saratovsky Uyezd
19th-century philosophers
19th-century journalists from the Russian Empire
19th-century male writers from the Russian Empire
19th-century novelists from the Russian Empire
Former Russian Orthodox Christians
Materialists
Journalists from the Russian Empire
Literary critics from the Russian Empire
Male writers from the Russian Empire
Russian atheists
Russian editors
Russian exiles in the Russian Empire
Russian male journalists
Russian male novelists
Russian nihilists
Russian philosophers
Russian revolutionaries
Russian socialists
Saint Petersburg State University alumni
Utopian socialists
Prisoners of the Peter and Paul Fortress